The 1924 Boston University Terriers football team was an American football team that represented Boston University as an independent during the 1924 college football season. In its fourth season under head coach Charles Whelan, the team compiled a 1–5 record, was shut out in four of six games, and was outscored by a total of 122 to 13.

Schedule

References

Boston University
Boston University Terriers football seasons
Boston University football